Camilo de Almeida Pessanha (7 September 1867 – 1 March 1926) was a Portuguese symbolist poet.

Biography

Early years
Camilo de Almeida Pessanha was born the illegitimate son of Francisco António de Almeida Pessanha, an aristocratic law student, and Maria do Espírito Santo Duarte Nunes Pereira, his housekeeper, on 7 September 1867, at 11.00 p.m., in Sé Nova, Coimbra, Portugal. The couple would have four more children.

In 1870, after his father's graduation, the family moved to Azores, where he had been appointed public defender.  In 1878 the Pessanha family was living in Lamego where young Camilo completed his basic schooling.  In 1884 he finished his secondary studies and, following his father's footsteps, entered law school at the Coimbra University.  A year later, he wrote his first poem, Lúbrica (Lascivious).  The next several years he would write more poems and publish some of them in local newspapers. From early 1888 up to late 1889 he interrupted his studies, due to his frail health quite affected by depression over a sorrow of love.

In October 1889 he resumed his studies and began a close and lifelong friendship with António Osório de Castro, a fellow student and director of a paper where he published some his poems. Pessanha also became intimate with his friend's sister, Ana de Castro Osório, a would-be writer and pioneer feminist in Portugal.  In 1890 he graduated, started working as an attorney and discovered the works of French poet Paul Verlaine, which would deeply influence him.

Life in Macau 
In August 1893, lured by the mysteries of the Orient, Pessanha applied for a position as philosophy teacher in the newly established gymnasium of Macau, then a Portuguese colony in distant China.  He was appointed on 18 December, along with Wenceslau de Moraes, among others.  On 19 February 1894 he sailed to Macau where he docked on 10 April.

In 1895 he bought a Chinese concubine from a broker.  Her name was Lei Ngoi Long and brought with her Ngun-Jen, her daughter. A year later, on 21 November, his son João Manuel would born.  The local Portuguese conservative community was shocked by this overt relationship, but Pessanha was disdainfully indifferent to them.

Throughout the years, Pessanha would return for short stays in Portugal, due to failing health. During one of his stays he would have met Fernando Pessoa, an ardent admirer of Pessanha's poetry, influencing his work between 1909-1911 - his Paulismo phase.

In spite of being thought of as an eccentric, over the years he became a central figure in the cultural, political and civic world of Macau. He was a respected teacher (of Philosophy, History, Geography, Portuguese Literature, Law), attorney and judge, and he was an adviser to the several governors of the city. In 1900 he was nominated public defender, and later judge.  To pass his time, besides composing poetry, he immersed himself in the local culture, collected Chinese art and became a respected China authority in the colony.

Pessanha died on 1 March 1926 of tuberculosis, aggravated by his chronic opium addiction.

His work 
Since the poet had the unique talent of re-writing his works from memory and had the habit of giving his poems to close friends, many of his poems had either become lost or inadvertently destroyed. To counter this, Ana de Castro Osório urged Pessanha to place his poems in a single volume. With Pessanha's blessing, João de Castro Osório published Clepsidra (1920).  In the years that followed, other poems not included in Clepsidra but attributed to Pessanha appeared in the Portuguese press. Clepsidra eventually came out in a 1945 edition and was radically re-edited in 1956. Gaspar Simões brought to light several more poems and versions of previously published poems as well as Pessanha's translations of Chinese elegies in his A Obra e o Homem: Camilo Pessanha (1967). In 1994, Paulo Franchetti authored a critical edition of Clepsidra including previously unknown fragments.

At first primarily influenced by Cesário Verde and Paul Verlaine, Pessanha became the most pure of Portuguese Symbolists.  His poems greatly influenced the Geração de Orpheu from Mário de Sá-Carneiro to Fernando Pessoa.

Notes

References
Saraiva, António José and Óscar Lopes (1993). História da Literatura Portuguesa. Oporto: Porto Editora, 17th ed.

External links 
 
 
  Brief biography in Portuguese
 Camilo Pessanha: No virar da clepsidra
 Clepsidra in Portuguese

1867 births
1926 deaths
20th-century Portuguese poets
Portuguese male poets
People from Coimbra
Philosophical pessimists
20th-century deaths from tuberculosis
University of Coimbra alumni
19th-century Portuguese poets
Symbolist poets
19th-century male writers
20th-century male writers
Drug-related deaths in Macau
Tuberculosis deaths in Macau